Marat Marsovich Romanov (born 5 June 1966) is a Russian wheelchair curler playing as alternate for the Russian wheelchair curling team. He and his team won the silver medal at the 2014 Paralympic Games, gold medals at the 2012, 2015, and 2016 World Championships, and the silver medal at the 2017 World Championships

Biography
Marat Romanov was born on 5 June 1966 in Chelyabinsk, Russian SFSR, Soviet Union. After school, Marat was trained as an assistant engine driver and spent a few years in the Soviet Navy before getting the job of a smelter at the Chelyabinsk Metallurgical Plant. In his spare time, he enjoyed mountaineering.

Romanov came to curling after a car accident in 1996, after which he received a vertebral compression fracture. He also did basketball and arm wrestling. In May 2007 he formed a curling team in Chelyabinsk, where he was a skip.

In 2009, he graduated from the Department of Physical Education at the Ural State Academy of Physical Education in Chelyabinsk.

Awards 
 Medal of the Order "For Merit to the Fatherland" I class (17 March 2014) – for the huge contribution to the development of physical culture and sports, and for the high athletic performances at the 2014 Paralympic Winter Games in Sochi
 Merited Master of Sports of Russia (2013)

References

External links 

 

1966 births
Living people
Russian male curlers
Russian wheelchair curlers
Paralympic wheelchair curlers of Russia
Paralympic medalists in wheelchair curling
Paralympic silver medalists for Russia
Wheelchair curlers at the 2014 Winter Paralympics
Wheelchair curlers at the 2018 Winter Paralympics
Medalists at the 2014 Winter Paralympics
World wheelchair curling champions
Recipients of the Medal of the Order "For Merit to the Fatherland" I class
Sportspeople from Chelyabinsk
20th-century Russian people
21st-century Russian people